Hellmouth is a 2014 Canadian horror film that was directed by John Geddes, based on a script written by Tony Burgess. The film had its world premiere on 17 October 2014 at the Toronto After Dark Film Festival and stars Stephen McHattie as a grave-keeper that finds himself traveling to hell to save the soul of a beautiful woman. Funding for Hellmouth was partially raised through an Indiegogo campaign.

Synopsis
Terminally ill and stuck with a depressing job as a grave-keeper, Charlie (Stephen McHattie) only wants to retire to Florida and live out the rest of his remaining days in peace. His hopes are dashed, however, when his boss Mr. Whinny (Boyd Banks) has forced Charlie to take on a job at another cemetery and postpone his retirement plans for the indefinite future. While traveling to the cemetery, Charlie meets Faye (Siobhan Murphy), a beautiful hitchhiker. They share an instant romantic connection but their happiness is threatened by the fact that Charlie's new cemetery is actually a gateway to hell that puts both of them at risk.

Cast
Stephen McHattie as Charlie Baker
Siobhan Murphy as Faye
Boyd Banks as Mr. Whinny
Julian Richings as Smiley
Mark Gibson as Cliff Ryan
Ari Millen as Harry
Tony Burgess as Tips
Adam Seybold as Mr. Praut
Kate Fenton as Mrs. Praut
Bruce McDonald as Kemp
Jason David Brown as The Bargeman

Reception
Critical reception for Hellmouth has been mostly positive. Dread Central praised the film for its visuals and for McHattie's acting, stating that they felt he was "quite simply the best man for this role". Bloody Disgusting was more mixed in their review, also praising McHattie while stating that "Ultimately the film suffers under both its heavy exposition and muddled second half."

References

External links
 

2014 films
2014 horror films
Heaven and hell films
Canadian supernatural horror films
English-language Canadian films
Crowdfunded films
Indiegogo projects
2010s English-language films
2010s Canadian films